Borgholm Church is a church in Borgholm on the Swedish Baltic Sea island of Öland. Belonging to Borgholm Parish of the Church of Sweden, it was opened on Pentecost Sunday in 1879.

References

External links

Churches in the Diocese of Växjö
19th-century Church of Sweden church buildings
Churches completed in 1879
Churches in Kalmar County